Prince Stanisław Jan Jabłonowski (1634–1702) was a Polish nobleman, magnate, Grand Guardian of the Crown since 1660, the Grand Camp Leader of the Crown since 1661, voivode of the Ruthenian Voivodship since 1664, Field Crown Hetman since 1676, Great Crown Hetman since 1683 and castellan of Kraków since 1692. Jabłonowski was a candidate for the Polish Throne following the death of King John III Sobieski.

A talented and skillful political and military leader, Jabłonowski participated in the War with Sweden during The Deluge, then with the Cossacks and Muscovy. He took part in the Chocim campaign of 1673 and participated in the Vienna expedition of 1683. He led the right wing of Polish cavalry forces at the Battle of Vienna. He also stopped the Tatars at Lwów in 1695. In 1692 Jabłonowski built the stronghold and the neighbouring town of Okopy Świętej Trójcy. During the Royal election of 1697, he supported Augustus II, later in opposition to the King. In 1698, Emperor Leopold I granted him and his family the hereditary title of Prince.

His daughter, Princess Anna Jabłonowska, who married Rafał Leszczyński, was the mother of King Stanisław I.

Biography

Stanisław was son of the Lord Sword-Bearer Jan Jabłonowski (1600–1647) and Anna Ostroróg, the daughter of author and scholar Jan Ostroróg. After the abdication of King John II Casimir in 1668, Jabłonowski supported the French prince Louis, Grand Condé as a candidate for the Polish crown. He died on 3 April 1702.

References

Bibliography
 Mała Encyklopedia Wojskowa, 1967, Wydanie I

External links
  by Rafal Heydel-Mankoo

Secular senators of the Polish–Lithuanian Commonwealth
Castellans of Kraków
Polish people of the Russo-Polish War (1654–1667)
1634 births
1702 deaths
Ruthenian nobility of the Polish–Lithuanian Commonwealth
Stanislaw Jan
People of the Great Turkish War
Field Crown Hetmans
Great Crown Hetmans